Philipp Ospelt (born 7 October 1992 in Munich, Germany) is a Liechtensteiner football striker who plays for Liechtenstein club FC Ruggell.

Career
Ospelt has played club football in Switzerland for Buchs and Liechtenstein for FC Vaduz and USV Eschen/Mauren.

He made his international debut for Liechtenstein on 13 October 2012 against Lithuania, coming on as a substitute for Philippe Erne.

References

1992 births
Living people
Liechtenstein footballers
Liechtenstein international footballers
Footballers from Munich
German footballers
German people of Liechtenstein descent
People with acquired Liechtenstein citizenship
Association football forwards
Liechtenstein under-21 international footballers
Liechtenstein youth international footballers
FC Vaduz players